Escambia County School System (ECSS), also known as Escambia County Schools, is a school district headquartered in Brewton, Alabama.

It serves all areas in Escambia County outside of Brewton. Communities within the district include Atmore, East Brewton, Flomaton, Pollard, and Riverview.

History
John Knott served as superintendent until 2021. Michele McClung was hired as the superintendent, with four board members voting in favor and three voting against. 21 people had applied for the position.

Schools
 High schools
 Escambia County High School
 Flomaton High School
 W.S. Neal High School
 Escambia Career Readiness Center

 Middle schools
 Escambia County Middle School
 W.S. Neal Middle School
 Pollard-McCall Junior High School

 Elementary schools
 Flomaton Elementary School
 Huxford Elementary School
 W.S. Neal Elementary School
 Rachel Patterson Elementary School
 Turtle Point Science Center

References

External links
 

School districts in Alabama
Education in Escambia County, Alabama